Doomsday Warrior, known in Japan as , is a 1992 Super NES fighting game developed and published by Telenet Japan's subsidiary Laser Soft in Japan on November 20, 1992 and later localized by Renovation Products in North America in March 1993. It was created during the fighting game trend of the 1990s that was popularized by Capcom's Street Fighter II.

Doomsday Warrior was added to the Nintendo Switch Online subscription service in February 2021.

Gameplay
The player takes the role of a member of the Doom Squad, a group of fighters who are under the influence of Main, a diabolical sorcerer (vengeful angel in Japan). The character the player chooses betrays the Doom Squad and battles for the people of Earth. To win, one's character must fight its former comrades of the Doom Squad. The player can choose which opponent to face after every battle. Ability Points are earned for winning each battle and are added to the character's current stats (Arm Power, Leg Power, Defense, Vitality, Soul Power).

Characters
These 7 fighters are the Doom Squad, the warriors who serve Main. Except for Grimrock and Nuform, they are from different parts of Earth.

Sledge
Sledge (スレッジ Surejji) is a hot-tempered fighter and became the first warrior to betray the Doom Squad to protect Earth from Main.

Layban
Layban (レイバン Reiban) was a soldier in the military until he betrayed them to join the Doom Squad.

Amon
Amon (アモン Amon) is the muscle of the Doom Squad and is also the frontman of his heavy metal band.

Daisy
Daisy (デイジー Deijī) is a hybrid creature of half-woman and half-plant. Her origins are unknown.

P. Lump
P. Lump (ポポ・ランプ Popo Rampu) is an overweight martial artist who breathes fire and uses his long braid like a weapon.

Grimrock
Grimrock (グリムロック Gurimurokku) is a lizardman from an alien world, using his claws and tail to attack his enemies.

Nuform
Nuform (ＬＣ・３８Ｘ Eru Shī Sanjūhachi Ekkusu) is a shapeless blob of liquid metal that can form a multitude of weapons for offense and shields for defense.

Bosses
After your chosen fighter defeats the remaining Doom Squad members, that fighter then faces off against Main and her two henchmen in 3 back-to-back matches.

Shadow
Shadow (シャドー Shadō) is a shapeless creature of darkness that can mimic any fighter and the first opponent in the final battle. Shadow takes the form of the player's character during the battle and can use its moves against that character.

Ashura
Ashura (アシュラ Ashura) is Main's strongest warrior and the second opponent in the final battle. He resembles Ashura and has incredible strength and demonic energy.

Main
Main (ダーゼマイン Dāzemain) is the sorcerer who commands the Doom Squad and is the final boss. He flies in midair and uses lightning, fire, and light to attack, can generate a force field and shield, and wields a sword of light. After Main loses, he zooms into the sky and spares Earth and its people.

Reception

Famitsu scored the game a 24 out of 40. Weekly Famitsu number 206, 1992  Power Unlimited gave a review score of 75% and they criticized the game being a boring beat-em-up.

References

1992 video games
Nintendo Switch Online games
Post-apocalyptic video games
Science fiction video games
Super Nintendo Entertainment System games
Fighting games
Multiplayer and single-player video games
Video games developed in Japan